Saldus District was an administrative division of Latvia, located in  Courland region, in the country's west.

District was divided during the administrative-territorial reform in 2009 into Brocēni Municipality and Saldus Municipality. In 2021 they were merged again into a new Saldus Municipality.

Cities and parishes

Saldus city 
Brocēni town
Ezeres parish
Gaiķu parish
Jaunauces parish
Jaunlutriņu parish
Kursīšu parish
Lutriņu parish
Nīgrandes parish
Novadnieku parish
Pampāļu parish
Rubas parish
Saldus parish
Šķēdes parish
Vadakstes parish
Zaņas parish
Zirņu parish
Zvārdes parish

Culture
Zvērā was  an annual non-commercial rock music festival held near Lašupe, former Saldus District, Latvia.

References

Districts of Latvia